Pechersk may refer to:
Pechersk, Kyiv, a neighborhood in Kyiv, Ukraine
Pechersk Raion, an urban district of Kyiv, Ukraine
Kyiv Pechersk Lavra, a historic monastery in Kyiv, Ukraine
Pechersk, Russia, several rural localities in Russia